Sarah Heyward (born June 28, 1984) is an American television writer and producer from Los Angeles. Her credits include Girls (2012), SKAM Austin (2018), and Modern Love (2021). Heyward is a daughter of former CBS News President Andrew Heyward.

See also
List of Girls episodes
65th Writers Guild of America Awards

References

External links
 
 

American women television producers
American television writers
Television producers from California
Screenwriters from California
Writers from Los Angeles
Living people
American women television writers
Place of birth missing (living people)
21st-century American women
1984 births